International Titanium was founded in 1981.  Its main component, a titanium manufacturing facility, was built in Moses Lake, Washington by the team of Stephen Yih, President and Edmund F. Baroch, Executive Vice President.

In the 1980s a controlling majority of shares was purchased by the Wyman-Gordon Company.

References 

Metal companies of the United States
Manufacturing companies based in Washington (state)